The China TV Drama Awards, also known as the Domestic TV Series Ceremony, is an award show presented annually on Anhui Television to award excellence in Chinese television.

Categories

Main Awards
Top Ten Television Series
Best Web Series 
Best Director
Best Screenwriter
Best Producer 
Best Actor
Best Actress
Best Supporting Actor
Best Supporting Actress
Best New Actor
Best New Actress 
Best Character 
Best Original Soundtrack 
Lifetime Achievement Award

Popularity Awards
Most Popular Television Series
Most Popular Actor 
Most Popular Actor/Actress (Mainland)
Most Popular Actor/Actress (Hong Kong/Taiwan) 
Most Popular Foreign Actor
Popular Actor Award
Most Popular On-screen Couple
Most Popular All-Rounded Artist

Misc Awards
Artist of the Year
Television Figure of the Year 
Influential Figure of the Year 
Media Recommended Actor 
Role Model Award
Outstanding Contribution Figure 
Special Contribution Award 
Most Appealing Actor 
Most Influential Actor 
Most Commercially Valuable Actor  
Excellent Actor 
Talented Actor 
Rising Actor
Acting Idol Award 
Most Promising Actor 
Best Breakthrough Spirit 
Best On-screen Performance 
Most Anticipated Actor by the Media
Actor with the Most Media Influence 
Most Talked About Actor 
Most Charismatic Actor On the Screen

Discontinued Awards
Best Long Drama
Best Foreign Drama
Best Quality Drama
Audience's Favorite OST Singer 
Charity Award

Main Awards

Top Ten Television Series

Best Web Series

Best Director

Best Screenwriter

Best Producer

Best Actor

Best Actress

Best Supporting Actor

Best Supporting Actress

Best New Actor

Best New Actress

Best Character

Best Original Soundtrack

Lifetime Achievement Award

Popularity Award

Most Popular Television Series

Most Popular Actor

Most Popular Actor/Actress (Mainland China)

Most Popular Actor/Actress (Hong Kong/Taiwan)

Most Popular Actor (Foreign)

Popular Actor/Actress Award

Most Popular On-screen Couple

Most Popular All-Rounded Artist

Misc Awards

Television Figure of the Year

Artist of the Year

Influential Figure of the Year

Role Model Award

Media Recommendation Award

Outstanding Contribution Figure

Special Contribution Award

Most Appealing Actor

Most Influential Actor

Most Commercially Valuable Actor

Excellent Actor

Talented Actor

Rising Actor

Acting Idol Award

Most Promising Actor

Best Breakthrough Spirit

Best On-screen Performance

Most Anticipated Actor by the Media

Actor with the Most Media Influence

Most Talked About Actor

Most Charismatic Screen Actor

Discontinued Awards

See also

 List of Asian television awards

Notes

References

 2017 Winners List 
 2017 Winners List (2)

Chinese television awards
Awards established in 2008
2008 establishments in China
Anhui Television original programming
Annual events in China
Recurring events established in 2008